Let George Do It! (US: To Hell With Hitler) is a 1940 British black-and-white comedy musical war film directed by Marcel Varnel and starring George Formby. It was produced by Michael Balcon for Associated Talking Pictures and its successor, Ealing Studios, and distributed in the UK by ABFD. This was the first comedy from this studio to deal directly with the Second World War.

Plot
At the beginning of the Second World War, before Germany invaded Norway, a ukulele player in a British dance band playing at a Bergen hotel, is found shot dead during a radio broadcast of the band's show. It turns out he was a British agent keeping an eye on the band leader, Mark Mendes (Garry Marsh), who is suspected of being a German agent passing on information about British shipping to German U-boats, using a code concealed in the radio broadcasts.

When Mendes calls a musician's agent in London for a replacement, British Intelligence tries to send another agent in his place. However, through a series of mistakes in a blacked out Dover, ukulele player George Hepplewhite (George Formby), who is on his way to Blackpool, is put on the boat to Bergen instead of the new agent. When he arrives, the receptionist at the hotel, Mary Wilson (Phyllis Calvert), who is another British agent, makes contact but eventually realises the mistake. George, however, is totally unaware and starts working with the band, although Mendes is suspicious of him. Eventually Mary tells George what is going on, and together they manage to find what the code is and alert the Royal Navy.

When Mendes discovers that his code has been broken, he gives George a cup of coffee containing a truth serum, and George reveals that he and Mary are British spies. George, drugged, is left in his room, where he dreams of flying to Germany and giving Hitler a right hook. Eventually, he flees to join Mary on board a ship, but it has already left. So he hides in a motorboat which takes Mendes to a German U-boat, with the intent to torpedo British troop ships as well as the ship that Mary is on. George manages to get on board and alert Mary's ship over the U-boat's radio. After a series of chaotic incidents on board, where George accidentally launches the U-boat's torpedoes and thus tells the British Navy where to find it, he hides in one of the empty torpedo tubes. So when Mendes tries to torpedo Mary's ship, he shoots out George instead, who flies through the air and lands on the ship deck, thus reuniting with Mary.

Cast

 George Formby as George Hepplewhite
 Phyllis Calvert as Mary Wilson
 Garry Marsh as Mark Mendez
 Romney Brent as Slim Selwyn
 Bernard Lee as Oscar
 Coral Browne as Iris
 Helena Pickard as Oscar's wife
 Percy Walsh as Schwartz
 Ronald Shiner as the Clarinetist
 Ben Williams as Radio Operator on SS Macaulay (uncredited)
 Jack Hobbs as Conway
 Torin Thatcher as the U-Boat Commander

Release
The film premiered at the Empire, Leicester Square in London on 12 July 1940, taking over after Gone with the Wind, which had run at the venue for 12 weeks.

According to Vic Pratt writing for the BFI's Screenonline website, it is "one of the best constructed and most consistently amusing of the George Formby comedies."

References

External links
 
 
 Let George Do It at the TCM Movie Database
 
Review of film at Variety

1940 films
1940 musical comedy films
British musical comedy films
British spy comedy films
British World War II propaganda films
British black-and-white films
1940s English-language films
Films directed by Marcel Varnel
Films produced by Michael Balcon
Associated Talking Pictures
Ealing Studios films
1940s spy comedy films
World War II spy films
Films with screenplays by Basil Dearden